In graph theory the conductance of a graph  measures how "well-knit" the graph is: it controls how fast a random walk on  converges to its stationary distribution. The conductance of a graph is often called the Cheeger constant of a graph as the analog of its counterpart in spectral geometry. Since electrical networks are intimately related to random walks with a long history in the usage of the term "conductance", this alternative name helps avoid possible confusion.

The conductance of a cut  in a graph is defined as:

The conductance of the whole graph is the minimum conductance over all the possible cuts:

 

Equivalently, conductance of a graph is defined as follows: 

 

Generalizations and applications
In practical applications, one often considers the conductance only over a cut. A common generalization of conductance is to handle the case of weights assigned to the edges: then the weights are added; if the weight is in the form of a resistance, then the reciprocal weights are added.

The notion of conductance underpins the study of percolation in physics and other applied areas; thus, for example, the permeability of petroleum through porous rock can be modeled in terms of the conductance of a graph, with weights given by pore sizes.

Conductance also helps measure the quality of a Spectral clustering. The maximum among the conductance of clusters provides a bound which can be used, along with inter-cluster edge weight, to define a measure on the quality of clustering. Intuitively, the conductance of a cluster (which can be seen as a set of vertices in a graph) should be low. Apart from this, the conductance of the subgraph induced by a cluster (called "internal conductance") can be used as well.

Markov chains

For an ergodic reversible Markov chain with an underlying graph G, the conductance is a way to measure how hard it is to leave a small set of nodes. Alistair Sinclair showed that conductance is closely tied to mixing time in ergodic reversible Markov chains. We can also view conductance in a more probabilistic way, as the minimal probability of leaving a small set of nodes given that we started in that set to begin with. Writing  for the conditional probability of leaving a set of nodes S given that we were in that set to begin with, the conductance is the minimal  over sets  that have a total stationary probability of at most 1/2. 

Conductance is related to Markov chain mixing time in the reversible setting.

See also 
 Resistance distance
 Percolation theory 
 Krackhardt E/I Ratio

References 
 
 

 A. Sinclair. Algorithms for Random Generation and Counting: A Markov Chain Approach. Birkhauser, Boston-Basel-Berlin, 1993.
 D. Levin, Y. Peres, E. L. Wilmer: Markov Chains and Mixing Times

Markov processes
Algebraic graph theory
Matrices
Graph invariants